was the tenth mayor of Hiroshima from 29 January to 2 April 1914.

References

Mayors of Hiroshima
1852 births
1922 deaths